LIBE or Libe may refer to:

 LIBE, the Committee on Civil Liberties, Justice and Home Affairs, a standing committee of the European Parliament
 Liberia, a country in western Africa
 Libé, informal name for Libération, a French newspaper
 Lithium beryllide, a chemical compound

People

 Libe Washburn (1874–1940), baseball player
 Libe Rieber-Mohn (born 1965), Norwegian politician
 Libe Goad (born 1974), technology and video game journalist